Emigrante may refer to:

Emigrantes Immigrants (1948 film)
El emigrante (film), a 1960 Spanish film
El emigrante (micro story), a very short story by Mexican author Luis Felipe Lomelí
Emigrante (Orishas album)
Emigrante (Tanghetto album)
El emigrante (song), a 1949 song by Juanito Valderrama

See also
 The Emigrants (disambiguation)